Rock X is a prominent offshore rock 0.4 miles (0.6 km) long, lying close inside the east side of the entrance to Victor Bay, 1 mile (1.6 km) northwest of Gravenoire Rock, on the Antarctic coast. It was photographed from the air by U.S. Navy Operation Highjump, 1946–47, and charted by the French Antarctic Expedition under Marret, 1952–53. The rocked was so named because the rock was indicated by a cross or "X" mark in selected prints of the Operation Highjump photographs for the purpose of identifying it to the French Antarctic Expedition party which established an astronomical control station there.

Rock formations of Adélie Land